The Stones of Venice may refer to:

The Stones of Venice (book), an 1851 three-volume collection of essays on Venetian art and architecture by John Ruskin
The Stones of Venice (audio drama), a 2001 audio play by Big Finish Productions based on the television series Doctor Who